The Isuzu D-Max is a pickup truck manufactured since 2002 by Isuzu Motors. A successor of the Isuzu Faster/KB, the first and second-generation model shares its platform with the Chevrolet Colorado. The third-generation model shares its platform with the third-generation Mazda BT-50, which is produced in the same Isuzu plant in Thailand.

In Australasia between 2003 and 2008, the D-Max was marketed as the Holden Rodeo, but then it was relaunched as the Holden Colorado. The Isuzu D-Max itself was also introduced during 2008, selling alongside the Holden-badged offering.

The D-Max also has an SUV counterpart based on the same platform, which is the MU-7 for the first-generation model, and the MU-X for the succeeding generations.

First generation (RA, RC; 2002)

Market

Thailand 

The D-Max pickup truck received its 2002 world premiere in Thailand. This location was chosen because GM-Isuzu had recently decided to close their small truck assembly plant in Japan and move their joint operation to Thailand. The D-Max was available in various models. The Spark (single cab) (EX) was available only as a 4x2, with three configurations between cab chassis, long bed with power steering and without. SpaceCabs (extended cab), and Cab4s (double cab) can be divided into two major configurations: standard height 4x2s (SL, SX, SLX), and 4x4s (S and LS) with the "Rodeo" name instead of SpaceCab. Crew cabs were all sold with the same Cab4 name (Cab4 models became available late in last quarter). All are built and sold alongside the almost identical Chevrolet Colorado which had debuted in the late first quarter of 2004.

Engine choices for that year until the end of third quarter of 2004 derived from its direct predecessor: 4JH1-T 3.0 and 4JA1-T 2.5.

Hi-Lander 3.0 (lifted 4x2), the trim style became available in late 2003, and ground clearance equals that of the 4x4 models. There were only two cab styles to choose between. This makes Isuzu the third manufacturer in Thailand to begin selling lifted 4x2 pickups (after Toyota and Ford).

In October 2004, Isuzu introduced the DDi iTEQ common-rail diesel engine family for the D-Max. The first engine to appear was the 3.0 4JJ1-TC , however, since then, a mid-cycle refresh brought many models fitted with a new front bumper that incorporated an "instant spoiler" underneath. Additionally, new MUA-5H five-speed manual transmission was also introduced.

During the first quarter of 2005, a 2.5 4JK1-TC , the second DDi iTEQ engine, was introduced and offered as an economical choice to replace its aging predecessor (4JA1-T was concurrently available for that year only). 4x4 models and Hi-Lander's suspensions were raised up 25 millimeters extra.

In the third quarter of 2006, the D-Max received a major facelift and the introduction of a third DDi iTEQ engine, 3.0 4JJ1-TCX. This engine is a modified 4JJ1-TC, incorporating a new Variable Valve Geometry Turbo (VGS). The extra power warranted an introduction of new transmissions as well: the MUX 5-Speed manual and MaxMatic-III automatic transmission. All models equipped with Xenon headlamps were changed to projector headlamps instead. Also introduced was the new "Hexapod-plot" interior. Other DDi iTEQ engines were also tweaked a bit for extra power and efficiency.

In 2007, Isuzu celebrated its 50th anniversary in Thailand with "Gold Series" models sold for the 2008 model year. The Hi-Lander Cab4 model with the VGS turbodiesel engine became available for the first time. The 4x4 models get a new front bumper design with chrome accents. Also added was the choice of a 2.5l 4-cylinder engine in LS 4x4 and Hi-Lander models.

During the middle of the first quarter of 2008, the Rodeo LS and Hi-Lander SpaceCab were also fitted with the 3.0-litre VVGS Turbodiesel engine to fill all the remaining gaps in the lineup.

In the early fourth quarter of 2008, Isuzu introduced D-Max Platinum models for 2009 to replace the outgoing Gold Series. LS 4x4 and Hi-Lander received a new front grille design; chrome on the LS 4x4 grade and semi platinum-silver on the Hi-Lander grade. Minor-modified headlamps and new fog lamps for a platinum look. 4x2 SLX and SX derived fascias from 4x4/Hi-Lander (before Platinum's fascia). Chrome fascia for 3.0 SLX models and color-keyed fascia for SX. Top heads of 3 DDi iTEQ engines changed from gold to platinum. Some models dropped the 4JJ1-TC 3.0l engine. All retooled to be acceptable with Biodiesel B5. All SpaceCab models featured new middle pillars called Safety Pillar Cab; pillars and door beam larger and thicker. Not all Cab4 models received retooled rear suspension called Super Flex Plus suspension. Spark EX also received new gauge and indicator. D-Max Platinum models commenced on sale from 15 October.

In the middle of September 2009, Isuzu introduced the D-Max Super Platinum models. SL model was dropped. Highline SLX 4x2 models received same fascia and front bumper as Hi-Lander / LS 4x4 style, new 16" wheels and newer styles of alloy wheels for SLX / Hi-Lander / LS 4x4, newer rear bumper, and new "Super Platinum" marque at the tailgate. LS 4x4 models received skid plate attached under the bumper in brighter silver, newer sidestep. Highline Hi-Lander / LS 4x4 models have newer style blind spot rear view mirrors, and new short-plot antenna.

Every year since late 2005 until now, there are several special D-Max & MU-7 models. Available exclusively only for a period during Thailand's 2 largest auto shows and also other special Isuzu occasions. They were all unique yet never the same in each presentation. D-Max Smart models are such one remarkably special model set. Available in several occasions during 2008. This edition modifies SpaceCab 4x2 2.5 by special white pearl exterior color and optional equipment such as immobilizer key.

Ever since Platinum models introduced, D-Max Smart models expanded up to 3 choices: SpaceCab 4x2, Cab4 4x2, and Hi-Lander 2-Door. These 3 models also updated as new Super Platinum models.

In 2009, a sport version of the D-Max named the X-Series was introduced, aimed especially for a target group of young people normally not interested in using pickup trucks. It was marketed as a "Lifestyle Pickup" and equipped with additional skirts and prominent red Isuzu letters at front grille. The wheels remain unchanged from the normal model but came with gunmetal paint finish. Available in two-door SpaceCab and four-door Cab4 body variants with a manual transmission.

In 2010, D-Max and MU-7 Super Titanium models were introduced. It featured a frontal camera, usually found in luxury cars, first time ever in a Thai pickup, and are the last model in this generation.

Malaysia 
The first generation Isuzu D-Max was launched in June 2005. In the year 2007, Isuzu Malaysia has revealed the latest facelift of its Isuzu D-Max double cab pick-up truck, which has a few improvements in terms of the 3.0-litre engine which now has more power and 19% more fuel efficiency than the pre-facelift version. Another new facelift was launched in 2009 and minor updates occurring in July 2011. The limited edition has been launched for the first generation Isuzu D-Max in Malaysia. The limited-edition is the "Hi-Def" from September 2008, the new limited edition "Hi-Def" launched from June 2012 limited to 210 units.

Australasia 

In Australia and New Zealand, the D-Max was sold as the third generation Holden Rodeo (RA) between 2003 and 2008, before being facelifted into the form of the Holden Colorado. This was a result of the GM-Isuzu split resulting in GM losing the right to use the "Rodeo" name. As with Rodeo, Colorado is available as either two- or four-wheel drive and in a range of body styles including single cab, space cab and crew cab. Power is provided by a range of petrol and diesel engines. Of the petrol engines, Holden offers a 2.4-litre four-cylinder as well as the Australian-made 3.6-litre Alloytec engine. The diesel powerplant is a four-cylinder Isuzu 4JJ1 unit displacing 3.0 litres. The main difference between Colorado and the Rodeo is the revised bodywork from the A-pillar forward.

During October 2008, the Isuzu D-Max was launched in Australia, alongside the almost identical Holden Colorado. Officially available in Australia as its own brand under the marketing name Isuzu UTE Australia, separate to the medium-heavy truck manufacturer, Isuzu Australia.

In June 2012, the RC series Holden Colorado was replaced by the RG model.

New Zealand 
In June 2010, Isuzu Utes New Zealand became the official distributor for Isuzu D-Max in New Zealand.

Europe 
In the United Kingdom, Isuzu UK is the official distributor for the Isuzu D-Max in summer 2012.

South America 
Julie Beamer, director of GM Chile, announced on 5 March 2008 to workers of the only remaining automobile factory in Chile, that said factory would be closed down on 31 July that year. The only vehicle that was in production at the time was the Chevrolet LUV. The announcement came shortly after then-president of Venezuela Hugo Chávez reduced the import quota for cars in Venezuela, the main export market for the Chilean-made Chevrolet LUV, but GM Chile said in its official statement that the reason behind the end of production in Arica was the lack of favorable conditions for vehicle manufacturing in Chile and fierce competition from many other car manufacturers and countries on Chile's car market.

Second generation (RT; 2011) 

In 2011, the Japanese automaker revealed the second-generation D-Max, which was designed in cooperation with General Motors and is a sister model to the second-generation Chevrolet Colorado. As with previous models, the D-Max shares its ladder chassis platform, body construction, mechanical componentry and interior design (dash, centre stack, steering wheel and doors) with the second-generation Chevrolet Colorado. The model features different front and rear end styling treatments as well as bespoke body panels.

Isuzu new ladder-frame chassis platform dubbed "i-GRIP" (Isuzu Gravity Responsive Intelligent Platform) underpinning the new D-Max makes 42% stronger than its predecessors leading to improved ride and handling. The frame includes improved cross bracing at the rear, improving stability under loads and while towing, while also "ensuring long-term durability when used regularly in harsh environments". The longer wheelbase of  –  longer than before – is now standard on all three body styles.

Transfer case marketing name has been renamed from "Touch-on-the-fly" button to new "Terrain command" system that uses the spin system to allow for seamless changing of drive modes from 4-Wheel to 2-Wheel Drive mode. Isuzu front suspension made up of independent double wishbone with coil-spring setup and a rear suspension made up of over slung leaf-springs installed above a special long span rear axle make for a comfortable driving experience.

The D-Max continues to be offered in all three body styles: Single Cab, Space Cab, and Crew Cab. Customers will also continue to have a choice of rear-wheel drive 4x2 and four-wheel drive 4x4 models. Space Extra Cab has laterally opening door to give easier access to the rear seat. D-Max is equipped including high-tensile steel, electronic stability control ESC, traction control (TCS), ABS, emergency brake assist, a number of airbags and electronic brakeforce distribution EBD. EBD detects the payload weight and modulates the rear braking force to compensate. In ESC fitted models ABS now goes to 4-channel 4-sensor type instead of the current 3-channel 4-sensor.

2015 facelift 

In 2015, the updated D-Max was introduced in Thailand, codenamed RT85. The front fascia was changed with a larger grille and new 1.9-litre RZ4E-TC turbodiesel engine debuted, replacing the 2.5-litre from the outgoing model. Interior remained unchanged from the old model except for some changes including newer 8" inch infotainment system, newer TFT gauges, and cruise control.

2017 facelift 
In 2017, the D-Max was updated again, with a newer front grille and bumper with Bi-LED projector headlamps with LED daytime running lamps, newer alloy wheels and some several changes in the interior for the 2018 model year.

Markets

South Africa 
In South Africa, D Max pick-ups are sold as the Isuzu KB Bakkie. But as of 2018, the KB is now called D-Max.

Philippines 
In the Philippines, the second generation was launched in September 2013. Isuzu's plans for production of the D-Max was temporarily in Thailand, and by October, the new D-Max was produced at Biñan plant until 2019 when Isuzu Philippines announced that they will stop local production of the D-Max and instead import the D-Max from Thailand. In October 2017, Isuzu Philippines has unveiled the 3.0 TD "Blue Power" diesel engine, along with MU-X.

Thailand 
The second generation D-Max was launched in September 2011. Available in 4 models line-up, 3 body type, 3 drivetrains; 2WD, High-ride 2WD (Hi-Lander) or 4WD (V-Cross) in Single cab (Spark), Space Cab and Crew Cab (Cab4) Spark was available only in the 2WD drivetrain. Spark 4WD became available in the 2014 model year. Models line-up are B, S, L, Z and Z Prestige. Standard 2WD models use beige cloth interior, Hi-Lander Z models come with black cloth interior, and Z-Prestige models come with Brown interior; 2.5-liter models come with cloth, 3-liter models come with leather, the meter is really changing, with added of multi-information display with support of Thai language menu operation, 2DIN CD player with Bluetooth and USB connection support or Kenwood DVD system (Changed Isuzu DVD-iGENIE Navi System in MY2013), Audio switch control, Driver power seat, Rear foldable seat (in Crew Cab models), also with over 10 position of intelligent storage space e.g. under steering wheel, over center console, 10-position cup holders.

In December 2012, the D-Max X-Series was launched in Thailand. Available in three models choices; SpaceCab Z model was called Speed model, Hi-Lander 2-door in Z model and Hi-Lander 4-door in Z-Prestige model. The exterior has a strip line decal on the body, piano-black front grille with the Isuzu badging in red, skirt around the body and black alloy wheel. The interior has a black and red cloth and leather for the Z-Prestige model. The Isuzu logo on the steering wheel were changed to red color. Exterior color choices are black and white.

In December 2013, for the 2014 model year, daytime running lamps became standard replacing the fog lamps and the rear lamps received an update for the L, Z and Z-Prestige models.

Malaysia 
The second generation Isuzu D-Max was launched in Malaysia in May 2013. The second-generation Isuzu D-Max to "Elevate Your Journey" is the promotional slogan for the new vehicle in Malaysia. A facelift was launched in October 2016 and minor updates occurring in February 2018. Multiple limited editions have been launched for the second generation Isuzu D-Max in Malaysia. The limited editions are the "X-Series" from November 2013 limited to 300 units, the "Artic" from September 2014 limited to 510 units and the "Beast" from May 2016 limited to 360 units. On 18 September 2019, Isuzu Malaysia company had launched the Isuzu D-Max 1.9L Ddi BluePower turbodiesel engine (codename RZ4E-TC), and this is the latest Isuzu D-Max pickup in Malaysia.

China 

In China, the second-generation D-Max was launched on 7 December 2014 by Jiangxi Isuzu Motors. The engine is 4JK1 2.5 L diesel with 5-speed manual/automatic transmission in 2WD and 4WD model.

A more affordable variant called the Isuzu Ruimai is also available in China. The Ruimai (or Remax) wears the logo of JIM (Jiangxi Isuzu Motors), not of Isuzu. Besides the ICE versions, an all-electric version is also offered.

A restyled variant known as the Ruimai S was unveiled in 2019.

Europe 
In UK, range are Single Cab, Extended Cab, Double Cab, Double Cab Eiger, Double Cab Yukon and Double Cab Utah and all except Single Cab use 4x4 powertrain as standard and featuring standard features like, 6 Airbags, Stability Control, Daytime running lights, Rev counter, Air conditioning, Front electric windows and Immobilizer and pricing start from GBP14,499 on the road in 4x2 single cab to GBP21,499 on the road in 4x4 double cab Utah with automatic.
In Turkey, available only in single cab (only one model in range) and double cab body and double cab range is HT (4x2 manual), T (4x4 manual), Limited (4x2 and 4x4 manual) and V-Cross (4x4 automatic), pricing start from 48,700 TL to 76,700 TL.
In August 2012, Euro NCAP crash test result for Isuzu D-Max is 4 out from 5 stars and 83% of adult protection. In some markets, the D-Max range consists of Single Cab, Space Cab and Double Cab vehicles available in three different trim levels: LX, LS and LSX. LX versions are only available with a 6-speed manual transmission made by AISIN. LS and LSX models have the option of a 5-speed AISIN automatic transmission.

Egypt 
In Egypt, a 2-door commercial variant of the D-Max is sold as the Chevrolet T-Series. It is powered by a 2.5-liter diesel producing  and  torque.

Engines 
D-Max uses Isuzu's own engine and drivetrain. Isuzu's iTEQ engine has been retained but has been updated. Engines performance have been upgraded with variable geometry turbocharger (VGS Turbo) and are compliant with Euro V emission standard. The second-generation D-Max features a 5-speed manual, with optional 5-speed Rev-Tronic automatic transmission with sport mode replacing the previous generation 4-speed automatic.

Ecuador is the only country where this generation D-Max is available with a petrol engine, an Opel-based 2.4-litre C24 engine with 16 valves and double overhead camshafts supplied from Brazil where the lower-grade versions of the Chevrolet S10 still rely on a flex-fuel 8-valve SOHC version which also served as a basis for the Vortec 2400 industrial engine.

Third generation (RG; 2019) 

The third-generation D-Max debuted in Thailand on 11 October 2019. The new D-Max has grown slightly in size with the most notable increase being the  wheelbase length. Isuzu claims the new D-Max delivers a reduced fuel consumption and improved safety.

The vehicle rides on the body-on frame Isuzu Dynamic Drive Platform, also called the Symmetric Mobility Platform later. The platform is claimed to be 23 percent stiffer. As for the improvements, the company has expanded the cross section of the ladder frame, optimised the locations of the crossmembers and increased impact absorption, making the frame lighter, stiffer and safer. To improve weight distribution, the engine has been moved slightly behind the front axle, resulting in a "semi-midship" layout.

In June 2020, Mazda released the third-generation BT-50 which is heavily based on the third-generation D-Max. As the result, it is also manufactured at Isuzu Motor Thailand. It is a result of an alliance between Mazda and Isuzu which was signed on 11 July 2016, with Isuzu agreeing to supply pickup trucks to Mazda. The third-generation D-Max ceased to share platform with Chevrolet Colorado.

Markets

Thailand 
The vehicle is available in the market as the Regular Cab, the Extended Cab, and the Crew Cab. The Regular Cab, also called a single cab is known as the D-Max Spark and is also available in Cab and Chassis version. The Extended Cab version is available in Space Cab and Hi-Lander grades. The Crew Cab is available in Cab 4, Hi-Lander 4, and V-Cross. As the top grade, the V-Cross comes with 6 airbags, blind spot monitoring, rear cross traffic alert, stability control, traction control, Bi-LEDs, and a UV blocking windshield. Later in 2021, the updated D-Max was launched in Thailand, with the pick-up gaining new enhancements followed by a slight price increase.

Cambodia 
The third generation D-Max was launched in Cambodia on 31 October 2020.

United Kingdom 
The third-generation D-Max was launched in the UK in January 2021. All grades offered in the UK are equipped with an advanced driver assist system (ADAS), which include adaptive cruise control, lane keeping assist, forward collision warning, pedal misapplication mitigation, and high beam assist. UK models is available in single, extended and double cab, either 4×2 or 4×4 variants, and four new grade levels. Later in 2021, Isuzu UK teamed up with Arctic Trucks to introduce the D-Max AT35, meant for serious off-roaders.

Philippines  
The third generation D-Max was launched in the Philippines on 4 March 2021. It was initially offered in 1.9 Single Cab, 1.9 LT 4×2, 3.0 LT 4×4, 1.9 LS 4×2, 3.0 LS 4×2, 3.0 LS-A 4×2, 3.0 LS 4×4 and 3.0 LS-E 4×4 grade models.

In July 2022, the LS grade was removed from the lineup and two new grade levels were introduced; 3.0 Single Cab 4×4 MT and 3.0 LS-A 4×4 MT.

Malaysia 
In Malaysia, the third generation D-Max was launched on 26 April 2021. It was initially offered in seven grade levels: 1.9L 4×4 Single Cab, 3.0L 4×4 Single Cab, 1.9L 4×4 MT Standard, 1.9L 4×4 AT Standard, 1.9L 4×4 AT Premium, 3.0L 4×4 AT Premium and 3.0L 4×4 AT X-Terrain.

In October 2021, a new 1.9 4x2 AT Plus grade was added to the line-up.

On 17 June 2022, the flagship 3.0 4x4 AT X-Terrain grade received some new feature upgrades including 2 new colour option, a 360-degree view monitor and wireless charging.

In February 2023, the Malaysian-market D-Max gets a refresh for the 2023 model year, with revisions applied inside and out bringing updates in terms of aesthetics as well as equipment. All seven grade levels remain on sale.

Indonesia 
The third generation D-Max was launched in Indonesia on 11 November 2021. It is offered in three grades: 1.9L MT Single Cab, 1.9L MT Double cab, and 1.9L MT Rodeo.

Engines 
The 1.9-litre and 3.0-litre four-cylinder turbodiesel engines were carried over from the previous generation. While the 1.9-litre RZ4E-TC engine remains unchanged, the 3.0-litre engine, now named 4JJ3-TCX, has received several updates, including a reshaped combustion chamber, higher-pressure injectors, a diamond-like carbon coating on the piston pins, an electronic variable geometry turbocharger and a double-scissor timing gear.

Safety 
The model has earned a five-star crash safety rating from ASEAN NCAP, Australasian NCAP and Euro NCAP. It is the first pick-up to receive five stars under the Euro NCAP assessment.

Sales

References

External links

 

D-Max
Pickup trucks
Mid-size sport utility vehicles
ANCAP pick-ups
ASEAN NCAP pick-ups
Euro NCAP pick-ups
Rear-wheel-drive vehicles
All-wheel-drive vehicles
Cars introduced in 2002